Chiu Kwok-chun  (1884 – 17 April 1957) was a New Zealand journalist, political reformer, newspaper editor, baptist missioner and community leader. He was born in Guangdong Province, China in 1884.

References

1884 births
1957 deaths
20th-century New Zealand politicians
Chinese emigrants to New Zealand
New Zealand Baptists
20th-century New Zealand journalists
20th-century Baptists